V4199 Sagittarii is a variable star in the southern constellation of Sagittarius. It is a dim star that is just visible to the naked eye with an apparent visual magnitude that varies between 6.22 and 6.28 over a period of 1.23825 days. The star is located at a distance of approximately 689 light years from the Sun based on parallax, but is drifting closer with a radial velocity of roughly −23 km/s. It has an absolute magnitude of −0.63, on average.

The stellar classification of this star is B5III, matching a B-type giant star. In the Bright Star Catalogue it was listed as a main sequence star of class B5V, although the colors suggest a somewhat more evolved star. The photometric variability of this star was announced by C. Waelkens and F. Rufener in 1985. The star has four times the mass of the Sun and three times the Sun's radius.

It has a magnitude 9.96 companion star at an angular separation of  along a position angle of 310°, as of 2003.

References 

B-type giants
Slowly pulsating B stars
Sagittarius (constellation)
Durchmusterung objects
Sagittarii, 173 G.
181558
095159
7339
Sagittarii, V4199